Rochester New York FC, formerly known as the Rochester Rhinos, was an American professional soccer team based in Rochester, New York, United States.

Founded in 1996, as the Rochester Raging Rhinos, they changed their name to Rochester Rhinos to start the 2008 season. RNY is the only non-MLS team to have won the U.S. Open Cup since the league's formation.

RNY FC most recently played in the 2017 USL season in the second tier of the United States soccer league system, followed by a four-year hiatus. They returned to play on March 25, 2022 in the inaugural game of the third division MLS Next Pro league.

History

1996–2017
Rochester Raging Rhinos was founded in 1996 and played in the now-defunct original A-League until it merged with the USISL for the 1997 season, creating the new A-League. After reaching the championship game in 1996 they won their first league championship in 1998.

In 1999 the club made it to the final of the U.S. Open Cup, where they defeated MLS club Colorado Rapids 2–0, becoming the first team from outside MLS to win the national cup since MLS's inception. This win was followed by two further A-League titles in 2000 and 2001.

A year after the A-League's renaming to the USL First Division in 2005, the Rhinos moved into the newly completed PAETEC Park, a 13,768-seat soccer-specific stadium now known as Marina Auto Stadium, and again made the championship game. the Rhinos were considered a candidate to be an expansion team at the MLS level when PAETEC Park was in the planning stages.

The team was declared insolvent in 2008 after defaulting on their stadium agreement, and PAETEC Park was seized by the city of Rochester. After a brief search for a new owner and investor who could improve the team's financial outlook, in March 2008 the club was taken over by Utica businessman Rob Clark. Clark changed the team's name to the "Rochester Rhinos," and assured that the financial situation of the team was stable and it would be able to play the next year. After two seasons under Clark the club joined the new NASL for its 2010 season.  The United States Soccer Federation refused the NASL's application for sanctioning, and instead operated its own temporary second-division league for 2010.  The Rhinos were part of that temporary USSF Division 2 Professional League. The Rhinos switched leagues again before the 2011 season to the then third-division USL Pro league, who considered themselves equally competitive with the second-division NASL.

The 2011 season ended with the Rhinos first in their division followed by a playoff season that lasted 2 games. The Rhinos saw off the Pittsburgh Riverhounds 4–0 in first round of the playoffs and then lost 2–1 at home to the Harrisburg City Islanders to finish the season. At the end of the season, head coach Bob Lilley was replaced by Jesse Myers, most recently an assistant coach of the Richmond Kickers.

In January 2013, the Rhinos became the official USL Pro affiliate of the New England Revolution. On May 19, Following a 1–6–1 start to the 2013 season, Myers was dismissed and Pat Ercoli named head coach. They missed the playoffs for the first time ever, finishing with a 6–10–10 record.

The league revoked the Clark family's ownership of the club in January 2016, citing the revocation of the lease on Rochester Rhinos Stadium by the City of Rochester. The league took over operations of the club until it could be sold to a new ownership group. David and Wendy Dworkin, minority owners of the Sacramento Kings basketball club, were identified as the Rhinos' new owners later in the month. The Dworkins were officially announced as the new owners on March 10, 2016.

2017–2023
On November 30, 2017, the Rhinos announced that they would go on hiatus. After almost a year of silence the team announced that it planned to move to the new third division league USL League One and return to the field in 2020. Moreover, the team announced that it had reached a deal with the City to vacate Marina Auto Stadium and stated it would be searching a site to build a new stadium. Towards the end of the first USL League One season, the Rhinos' President Pat Ercoli announced on Uncle Sam's Soccer Podcast that due to delays and pacing of the development of the Rhinos' new stadium that the team would likely sit out the 2020 season and relaunch in 2021.

On November 30, 2017, the team announced that they would not play in 2018 while additional funding was sought. On August 22, 2018, it was announced that the club would pursue a new stadium location and attempt to join USL League One.

In June 2021, Jamie Vardy was announced as co-owner of the franchise and intends to field a team for the 2022 season. Lee Tucker, who was the project leader at Vardy’s successful V9 Academy – which gave opportunities to non-league players in England seeking to break into the professional game, will be appointed Sporting Director.

On September 1, 2021, it was announced that the club had gone through an extensive makeover as part of the club’s rebirth, the Rhinos had a complete rebrand to Rochester New York FC or RNYFC for short, and had a new logo introduced.  The new club badge features an abstract rendering of Rochester's High Falls waterfall.

The club returned to play in 2022, and were the only independent club in the new MLS Next Pro league. They made the playoffs but were eliminated in the quarterfinals. On March 10, 2023, Rochester New York FC withdrew from MLS Next Pro and ceased operations citing an "unsustainable business model".

Stadiums

 Fauver Stadium; Rochester, New York (1996)
 Frontier Field; Rochester, New York (1996–2005)
 Marina Auto Stadium; Rochester, New York (2006–2017)
 John L. DiMarco Field; Brighton, New York (2022)

The Raging Rhinos first began play in 1996 at Fauver Stadium, a soccer venue at the University of Rochester. They then played at Frontier Field, a Minor League Baseball park, from 1996 to 2005.

Starting in 2006, the team played in Marina Auto Stadium, a soccer-specific stadium built for their use. When the Rhinos went on hiatus at the end of 2017, they originally sought to remain at the stadium, scheduling neutral-site USL matches during the 2018 season to meet the terms of their lease. However, in August 2018 the team announced they would be seeking a new venue.

In June 2021, when the team announced a new co-owner ahead of a planned return to play in 2022, they indicated they would play at Empire United Soccer Complex in Henrietta, New York. However, Empire United's field had no stands, concessions, or other amenities, and would have required upgrades for professional soccer use. In order to be ready for a March 2022 kickoff in MLS Next Pro, the team announced in December 2021 that they would instead play at John L. DiMarco Field, a 1,500-capacity soccer and lacrosse venue at Monroe Community College in Brighton, New York.

Club culture

Supporters
Rochester New York FC had two major supporters' groups. Founded in 2011, the Oak Street Brigade previously occupied section 101 at Capelli Sport Stadium, the former home of the Rochester Rhinos. The other major supporters' group is the North Star Ultras.

Notable former players
See also All-time Rochester Rhinos roster

Rochester Rhinos Hall of Fame
2011: Lenin Steenkamp
2012: Craig Demmin, Doug Miller, Pat Onstad
2013: 1999 U.S. Open Cup Team
2014: Yari Allnutt, Scott Vallow
2015: Darren Tilley, Mali Walton

Retired numbers
 14 – Mickey Trotman
 19 – Doug Miller

Head coaches
  Pat Ercoli (1996–2004)
  Laurie Calloway (2005–2007)
  Darren Tilley (2008–2009)
  Bob Lilley (2010–2011)
  Jesse Myers (2012–2013)
  Pat Ercoli (interim, 2013)
  Bob Lilley (2014–2017)
  Bruno Baltazar (2022)

Honors

League
USL Championship
Champions (1): 2015
Winners (Playoffs): 2015
Winners (Regular Season): 2015
 USSF Division 2 Professional League
 Regular Season Champions (1): 2010
 USL Conference Champions (1): 2010
USL A-League
 Winners (3): 1998, 2000, 2001
 Northeast Division Champions (3): 1998, 1999, 2002

Cups
 U.S. Open Cup
 Winners (1): 1999
 runners-up (1): 1996

Record

Year-by-year

1. Avg. attendance include statistics from league matches only.
2. Top goalscorer(s) includes all goals scored in league play, playoffs, U.S. Open Cup, and other competitive matches.
3. Points and PPG have been adjusted from non-traditional to traditional scoring systems for seasons prior to 2003 to more effectively compare historical team performance across seasons.
4. Pts in 2008 excludes one deducted point for fielding an ineligible player.

References

External links

 
Association football clubs established in 1996
Association football clubs disestablished in 2023
Men's soccer clubs in New York (state)
Defunct soccer clubs in New York (state)
Former USL Championship teams
MLS Next Pro teams
American Professional Soccer League teams
USL First Division teams
A-League (1995–2004) teams
1996 establishments in New York (state)
2023 disestablishments in New York (state)
U.S. Open Cup winners